Eduardo José Copello (February 13, 1926 in San Juan Province – February 27, 2000) was an Argentine racing driver. He won the Turismo Carretera championship in 1967 and the Sport Prototipo Argentino  championship in 1969.

1926 births
2000 deaths
Argentine racing drivers
Turismo Carretera drivers
World Sportscar Championship drivers